Medovik (from мёд – 'honey') is a layer cake popular in countries of the former Soviet Union. The identifying ingredients are honey and smetana (sour cream) or condensed milk.

It is a dessert which is known for its lengthy preparation time. It consists of layers of sponge cake with a cream filling and is often covered with nuts or crumbs made from leftover cake. While the thin layers harden shortly after coming out of the oven, the moisture of the filling softens it again over time. There are many recipes and variations of this cake, but, the main ingredient is honey, giving it the characteristic taste and flavor.

Origins 
According to Russian tradition, the cake was created in the 19th century in the Russian Empire by a young chef who sought to impress Empress Elizabeth Alexeievna, wife of Alexander I. Empress Elizabeth could not stand honey, and any dish made with it drove her mad. One day, however, a young new confectioner in the Imperial kitchen did not know the empress's dislike, and he baked a new cake with honey and thick sour cream. Surprisingly, and unaware of the honey content, Empress Elizabeth immediately fell in love with it. 

Despite this legend, traditional Russian cookbooks make "little or no mention" of medovik. Medovik gained its intense popularity during the Soviet era. Today, there are numerous variations of medovik: with condensed milk, buttercream or custard.

Similar recipes 

Similar to Medovik desserts are popular also in other Eastern and Central European countries. There is the Czech Medovnik and the Polish Miodownik. In Bulgaria Medovik is mostly known under the name French Village Cake. Ukrainian medivnyk is cooked without the cream.

See also
 List of cakes

References 

Russian desserts
Layer cakes
Honey cakes